Hesperomyia is a genus of flies in the family Tachinidae.

Species
H. erythrocera Brauer & Bergenstamm, 1889
H. petiolata (Townsend, 1919)

References

Exoristinae
Diptera of North America
Tachinidae genera
Taxa named by Friedrich Moritz Brauer
Taxa named by Julius von Bergenstamm